Lord Have Mercy or Lord, have mercy may refer to:
 Lord, have mercy or Kyrie eleison, a Christian prayer
 Lord Have Mercy!, a Canadian television sitcom
 Lord Have Mercy (rapper), American hip hop musician

See also
 Lord, Have Mercy on Us or Hospodine, pomiluj ny, a Czech song
 Lord, have mercy upon us (Mendelssohn), a 1833 motet by Felix Mendelssohn